Kevin Corn is an American former voice actor who voiced characters in anime for ADV Films. Some of his major roles include Daisuke Niwa the title character in D.N. Angel, Kotaro Kobayashi in Angelic Layer, Colonel MacDougall in Spriggan and Kouryu in Saiyuki.

Personal life
After 2005, he relocated to Nashville, Tennessee. He is currently a cancer researcher and chemical/bio-molecular engineering PhD student at Vanderbilt University.

Anime filmography

References

External links

Kevin Corn at the English Voice Actor & Production Staff Database
Twitter Account

Living people
American male voice actors
Year of birth missing (living people)